Waldron Glacier is a channel glacier flowing to the east side of Porpoise Bay, midway between Sandford and Morse Glaciers. Delineated from air photos taken by U.S. Navy Operation Highjump (1946–47). Named by Advisory Committee on Antarctic Names (US-ACAN) for Thomas W. Waldron, captain's clerk on the brig Porpoise of the United States Exploring Expedition (1838–42) under Wilkes.

See also
 List of glaciers in the Antarctic
 Glaciology

References
 

Glaciers of Wilkes Land